Kayabwe, is a town in the Buganda Region of Uganda. It is an urban center in Mpigi District.The LC 5 Councilor of Kayabwe TC is Mr. Mwanje Alex Andrew. The town sits astride The Equator.

Location

The geographical coordinates of Kayabwe are 0°00'02.0"S, 32°02'22.0"E (-0.000556, 32.039444).

Points of interest
The Kampala-Masaka Highway, passes through Kayabwe in a general northeast to southwest direction. The Equator passes through the middle of town in a west to east direction, as can be deduced from the town's geographical coordinates.

The town is a favorite tourist stopping point. Many stop to take photographs of the Equator Monument, eat at the restaurants located there and/or buy African crafts at the nearby crafts shops. There are plans by the Uganda Tourism Board and Mpigi District Administration, to develop and modernise the location and attract more tourists.

Kayabwe has access to potable piped water supply, following improvements between 2011 and 2017, funded with loans from the African Development Bank.

Banking services are offered by Centenary Bank, a large retail commercial bank that maintains a branch in town.

See also
 List of cities and towns in Uganda

References

External links
National Population and Housing Census 2014 Area Specific Profiles: Mpigi District

Populated places in Central Region, Uganda
Mpigi District